Harry Taylor may refer to:

Sports

Baseball
 Harry Taylor (1890s first baseman) (1866–1955), played for the Louisville Colonels and Baltimore Orioles
 Harry Taylor (1930s first baseman) (1907–1969), played for the Chicago Cubs
 Harry Taylor (1946–52 pitcher) (1919–2000), played for the Brooklyn Dodgers and Boston Red Sox
 Harry Taylor (1957 pitcher) (1935–2013), played for the Kansas City Athletics

Football
 Harry Taylor (Australian rules footballer) (born 1986), Australian rules footballer for the Geelong Football Club
 Harry Taylor (footballer, born 1889) (1889–1960), English footballer
 Harry Taylor (footballer, born 1881) (1881–1917), Scottish footballer
 Harry Taylor (footballer, born 1935) (1935–2017), English footballer
 Harry Taylor (footballer, born 1997), English footballer

Other sportsmen
 Harry Taylor (alpine skier) (born 1924), British Olympic skier
 Harry Taylor (cricketer) (1900–1988), English cricketer
 Harry Taylor (mountaineer) (born 1958), British SAS member and mountaineer 
 Harry Taylor (ice hockey) (1926–2009), retired professional ice hockey player
 Harry Taylor (rugby league), rugby league footballer of the 1900s for Great Britain, England, and Hull F.C.
 Harry Taylor (swimmer) (born 1968), Canadian Olympic swimmer
 Harry Taylor (bowls) (born 1930), English lawn bowler

Others
 Harry Taylor (activist), critic of the Bush administration
 Harry Taylor (аctor), played Mr. Gloop in Charlie and the Chocolate Factory and the King's Cross station guard in the first two Harry Potter films
 Harry Taylor (engineer) (1862–1930), U.S. Army Chief of Engineers and general
 Harry S Taylor, editor of the Murray Pioneer, South Australian newspaper
 USS General Harry Taylor (AP-145), a transport ship in the United States Navy in World War II

See also
 Henry Taylor (disambiguation)
 Harold Taylor (disambiguation)

Taylor, Harry